Midas (formerly, Shady Run) is an unincorporated community in Placer County, California. It lies at an elevation of 4153 feet (1266 m).

The Shady Run post office operated from 1872 to 1879 and from 1903 to 1904.

References

Unincorporated communities in California
Unincorporated communities in Placer County, California